Strathspey Place is a state of the art performing arts centre located in Mabou, Nova Scotia.

Built in 2000, the theatre is co-located with Dalbrae Academy in what is referred to as Allan J. MacEachen International Academic & Cultural Centre.

Strathespey Place is a theatre itself with 488 (491) seat capacity and a 60' x 30' performance stage.

The operations are maintained by a staff of one, whom handles marketing, ticket sales and programming.

Usage
The need to preserve and promote this unique and diverse cultural heritage brought community groups together to envision a facility which would be appropriate for the performance, production, and training requirements of the region.

References

External links
 Strathspey Place Official Website

Theatres in Nova Scotia
Buildings and structures in Inverness County, Nova Scotia
Tourist attractions in Inverness County, Nova Scotia